"Radio" is a song by German Neue Deutsche Härte band Rammstein. It was released as the second single from the band's untitled seventh studio album on 26 April 2019.

Lyrically, the song addresses the cultural situation of the German Democratic Republic, in which secretly listening to western radio stations and their music, which were deemed illegal by the East German government, was a way to escape the political restrictions. Metal Hammer stated the song's riff may have been influenced by "Love Like Blood", by Killing Joke.

Music video
The video, which is almost entirely black and white, was released online on 26 April 2019 at 11:00 CET following a 26-second black and white preview for the video two days prior, containing Kraftwerk and Klaus Nomi references. On selected radio stations the song premiered on 25 April 2019 at 21:00 CET, while the video was shown exclusively on the wall of a house - without sound - in Berlin. The video was directed by Jörn Heitmann.

The video opens with a radio announcement (absent in the album version) that says "Achtung, Achtung. Hier ist Berlin Königs Wusterhausen und der Deutsche Kurzwellensender. Wir senden Tanzmusik", which translates as "Attention, Attention. This is Berlin Königs Wusterhausen and the German shortwave transmitter. We're broadcasting dance music". Königs Wusterhausen is the site where the first German radio transmitter was built, in 1920. In 1933, it was seized by the Nazi regime in order to broadcast propaganda. After the Reunification of Germany, it became a museum.

It depicts the band dressed up in tuxedos (with the notable exception of bassist Oliver Riedel who wears a black turtleneck sweater and performs barefoot) at a radio performance set roughly in the 1920s. During the final chorus, the performance is set to be shut down by a police squad but it is revealed that the band members are holograms and thus unaffected by the use of violent force. The performance scenes are intercut with scenes of citizens being obsessed with their radios to a manic degree as well as riots demanding free and open airwaves, echoing the lyrical themes of the song.

Track listing

Charts

Certifications

Release history

References

2019 singles
German-language songs
Rammstein songs
Songs written by Till Lindemann
Songs written by Paul Landers
Songs written by Richard Z. Kruspe
Songs written by Christian Lorenz
Songs written by Oliver Riedel
Songs written by Christoph Schneider